Menjez   (also Mounjez) is a  town in Akkar Governorate, Lebanon, close to the border with Syria.

The population of Menjez is mostly  Maronite.

History
In 1838, Eli Smith noted  the village as Menjaz,  located east of esh-Sheikh Mohammed. The residents were Maronites.

References

Bibliography

External links
Menjez, Localiban 

Populated places in Akkar District
Maronite Christian communities in Lebanon